The 2022 U.S. Pro Women's Clay Court Championships was a professional tennis tournament played on outdoor clay courts. It was the seventh edition of the tournament which was part of the 2022 ITF Women's World Tennis Tour. It took place in Palm Harbor, Florida, United States between 11 and 17 April 2022.

Singles main draw entrants

Seeds

 1 Rankings are as of 4 April 2022.

Other entrants
The following players received wildcards into the singles main draw:
  Hailey Baptiste
  Sophie Chang
  Peyton Stearns
  Taylor Townsend

The following players received entry from the qualifying draw:
  Hanna Chang
  Salma Djoubri
  Elvina Kalieva
  Gabriela Lee
  Maegan Manasse
  Seone Mendez
  Whitney Osuigwe
  María José Portillo Ramírez

The following player received entry as a lucky loser:
  Catherine Harrison

Champions

Singles

   Katie Volynets def.  Wang Xiyu 6–4, 6–3

Doubles

  Sophie Chang /  Angela Kulikov def.  Irina Bara /  Lucrezia Stefanini 6–4, 3–6, [10–8]

References

External links
 2022 U.S. Pro Women's Clay Court Championships at ITFtennis.com
 Official website

2022 ITF Women's World Tennis Tour
2022 in American tennis
April 2022 sports events in the United States